Andri Rúnar Bjarnason (born 12 November 1990) is an Icelandic professional footballer who plays as a forward for ÍBV.

Career

Early career
Andri started his career with his hometown club Ungmennafélag Bolungarvíkur in 2005. The next nine seasons, he played for BÍ/Bolungarvík, a joint team of Boltafélag Ísafjarðar and Ungmennafélag Bolungarvíkur. In 2015, he moved to Pepsi Deildin club Víkingur Reykjavík. Between these moves Andri also attended college in the US and played with North Carolina Wesleyan College's soccer team where he was named USA South Rookie of the Year honors and to the All-South Atlantic Region Second Team.

Grindavík
In 2016, Andri joined Inkasso League's Grindavík on loan from Víkingur Reykjavík and helped the club achieve promotion to Úrvalsdeild karla. After the season he transferred to the club and in 2017 he took the Úrvalsdeild by storm, scoring 18 goals in his first 20 matches. On September 30, Andri tied the single season goal record in the Úrvalsdeild when he scored on the 88 minute in Grindavík's final game of the season.

Helsingborgs IF
On 4 November 2017, Andri signed for Helsingborgs IF. On 10 November 2018 he scored twice in Helsingborg's 3–1 victory against Varberg in the last game of the season, helping the club finish first in the Superettan. He also finished first in goals scored during the season with 16 goals. On 14 June it was reported that Helsinborgs had sold Andri to 1. FC Kaiserslautern.

1. FC Kaiserslautern
On 17 June 2019, Andri signed for 1. FC Kaiserslautern.

Esbjerg fB
After a disappointing season in Germany, it was confirmed on 10 August 2020, that Andri had joined newly relegated Danish 1st Division club Esbjerg fB on a deal until the summer 2022. On 13 December 2021, Andri's contract was terminated by mutual consent.

ÍBV
In December 2021, Andri returned to Iceland and signed with ÍBV.

International career
In January 2018, Andri was selected to the Icelandic national football team ahead of its two unofficial friendly matches in Indonesia. He played his first game for the national team on 11 January, scoring one goal in Iceland's 6–0 victory against Indonesia Selection in Maguwoharjo Stadium.

International goals
Scores and results list Iceland's goal tally first, score column indicates score after each Andri goal.

Honours

Club
Superettan: 2018

Individual
Superettan top goal scorer: 2018
Úrvalsdeild karla top goal scorer: 2017
2. deild karla top goal scorer: 2010

References

External links
 
 North Carolina Wesleyan 2012 statistics

1990 births
Living people
Andri Bjarnason
Association football forwards
Andri Bjarnason
Andri Bjarnason
Andri Bjarnason
Andri Bjarnason
Andri Bjarnason
Helsingborgs IF players
1. FC Kaiserslautern players
Esbjerg fB players
Andri Bjarnason
Andri Bjarnason
Andri Bjarnason
Andri Bjarnason
3. Liga players
Superettan players
Andri Bjarnason
Expatriate footballers in Sweden
Andri Bjarnason
Expatriate footballers in Germany
Andri Bjarnason
Expatriate men's footballers in Denmark
Andri Bjarnason